Megi Doçi (born 14 October 1996) is an Albanian footballer who plays as a forward and has appeared for the Albania women's national team.

Career
Doçi has been capped for the Albania national team, appearing for the team during the 2019 FIFA Women's World Cup qualifying cycle.

International goals

See also
List of Albania women's international footballers

References

External links
 
 
 

1996 births
Living people
People from Mat (municipality)
Albanian women's footballers
Women's association football forwards
KFF Vllaznia Shkodër players
Albania women's international footballers